Of the 24 Ohio incumbents, 21 were re-elected.

See also 
 List of United States representatives from Ohio
 United States House of Representatives elections, 1972

1972
Ohio
1972 Ohio elections